Sardhana is a village in Medak district in state of Telangana, India.

References

Villages in Medak district